The 1859 Alabama gubernatorial election took place on August 1, 1859, in order to elect the governor of Alabama.  Democrat Andrew B. Moore won his second term as governor.

Candidates

Democratic Party
 Andrew B. Moore, incumbent Governor

Southern Rights Democrat
 William F. Samford, candidate, most likely the father of William J. Samford

Election

Statewide

County by county

References

Alabama gubernatorial elections
1859 Alabama elections
Alabama
August 1859 events